The Collected Stories of Grace Paley brings together selected stories from the author's previous volumes of fiction: The Little Disturbances of Man (1959), Enormous Changes at the Last Minute (1974), and Later the Same Day (1985). The book was a finalist for the National Book Award for Fiction in 1994.

References

1994 short story collections
American short story collections
Farrar, Straus and Giroux books